Wascoroni Ahmed is a first-class and List A cricketer from Bangladesh. He was born on 1 July 1984 in Comilla, Chittagong and is a right-handed batsman and right arm fast medium bowler. Sometimes referred to on scoresheets by his nickname Palash, he made his debut for Chittagong Division in 2004/05 and played through the 2006/07 season. He has twice taken 5 wickets in an innings, with a best of 8 for 69 against Rajshahi Division. His only first-class fifty, 88, came against Barisal Division. He took 5 for 27 against Rajshahi Division in a one-day game.

References

Bangladeshi cricketers
Chittagong Division cricketers
Living people
1984 births
People from Comilla